An election was held on 23 February 2013 to elect the Members of the Legislative Assembly (MLA) from each of the 60 Assembly Constituencies (ACs) in the state of Nagaland in India.

Background
The mandate of the 11th Nagaland Legislative Assembly, formed after the 2008 election, expired on 10 March 2013. Hence, the 12th Nagaland Legislative Assembly election was announced by the Election Commission of India.

After the scrutiny of the nomination papers put up by the candidates, 188 candidates in total were able to contest for a total of 60 seats.

Results 
A total of 1,098,007 people voted out of an eligible electorate of 1,198,449, representing a turnout of 90.19%.

Elected members

Aftermath

On 18 Jun 2014, 3 of the NCP MLAs defected to the BJP, leaving only one NCP MLA remaining in the assembly.

See also
Liezietsu ministry

References 

2013 in Nagaland
State Assembly elections in Nagaland
2010s in Nagaland
2013 State Assembly elections in India